Minab Toyur Hormozgan Football Club is an Iranian football club based in Minab, Iran. They currently compete in the 2012–13 Iran Football's 2nd Division.

Season-by-Season

The table below shows the achievements of the club in various competitions.

See also
 2012–13 Iran Football's 2nd Division

Football clubs in Iran
Association football clubs established in 2012